Hélène Esnault (born 17 July 1953) is a French and German mathematician, specializing in algebraic geometry.

Biography
Born in Paris, Esnault earned her PhD in 1976 from the University of Paris VII. She wrote   her dissertation on Singularites rationnelles et groupes algebriques (Rational singularities and algebraic groups) under the direction of Lê Dũng Tráng.

She did her habilitation at the University of Bonn in 1985, and pursued her studies at the University of Duisburg-Essen. Afterwards, she was a Heisenberg scholar of the Deutsche Forschungsgemeinschaft (DFG) at the Max Planck Institute for Mathematics in Bonn.

She became the first Einstein Professor at Freie Universität Berlin in 2012, as head of the algebra and number theory research group, after working previously at the University of Duisburg-Essen, the Max-Planck-Institut für Mathematik in Bonn, and at the University of Paris VII.

In 2007 Esnault was editor-in-chief and founder of the journal Algebra & Number Theory. From 1998 to 2010 she co-edited Mathematische Annalen; she has also served as editor of Acta Mathematica Vietnamica, Astérisque, Duke Mathematical Journal, and Mathematical Research Letters.

Awards and honors 
In 2001 she won the Prix Paul Doistau-Émile Blutet of the Académie des Sciences de Paris. In 2003, Esnault and Eckart Viehweg 
received the Gottfried Wilhelm Leibniz Prize. In 2019, she won the Cantor medal.

References

External links 
 
 Homepage
 Book: Hélène Esnault, Eckart Viehweg: "Lectures on Vanishing Theorems" (PDF, 1.3 MB)

1953 births
Living people
École Normale Supérieure alumni
Gottfried Wilhelm Leibniz Prize winners
20th-century French mathematicians
21st-century French mathematicians
French women mathematicians
Academic staff of the Free University of Berlin
Members of Academia Europaea
20th-century women mathematicians
21st-century women mathematicians
Prix Paul Doistau–Émile Blutet laureates
Members of the German Academy of Sciences Leopoldina
20th-century French women
European Research Council grantees